UDP-glucuronosyltransferase 2B17 is an enzyme that in humans is encoded by the UGT2B17 gene.

UGT2B17 belongs to the family of UDP-glucuronosyltransferases (UGTs; EC 2.4.1.17), enzymes that catalyze the transfer of glucuronic acid from uridine diphosphoglucuronic acid to a variety of substrates, including steroid hormones.[supplied by OMIM] It also metabolizes 3-hydroxycotinine, which is minor nicotine metabolite

References

Further reading